The Cabo Verde Music Awards (abbreviation: CVMA) is an annual music award ceremony that takes place every year. The award ceremony takes place in the capital city of Praia, Cape Verde. It is also broadcast on TCV.

History

The origins of the creation of the music awards for Cape Verde began in the 2000s.

The first edition took place in March 2011 and was one of the most recent music awards made by any country, featuring some of the greatest Cape Verdean musicians from the diaspora abroad. The first guests included Gilyto, La MC Malcriado and Suzanna Lubrano.  The recent edition took place on  2016, featuring Elida Almeida, Gilyto, Hélio Batalha and others.

Categories
The following music categories include:

Best Acoustic Album:
2012: "Caldera Preta" by Mirri Lobo
Best Coladeira:
2011: "Reggadeira" by Maria de Barros
2012: "Caldera Preta" by Mirri Lobo
2015: A single by Jorge Serna
Best Funaná:
2011: "É Si Ki’m Feitu” by La MC Malcriado
2015: A single by Lejemea
Best Male Singer:
2012: Mirri Lobo
Best Female Singer:
2013: Carmen Souza
Best Morna:
2011: "Reggadera" by Maria de Barros
2013: "Kachupada" by Carmen Souza
2015: A single by Gardénia Benrós
Best Music of the Year:
2012: "Caldera Preta" by Mirri Lobo
Best Music Video:
2013: "Simple Girl" by Nelson Freitas

Editions
1st - 2011, held on March 12:
Producer: Gilyto, participants: Maria de Barros, Gilyto, Suzanna Lubrano, La MC Malcriado
2nd - 2012, held in March:
Participants: Bana, Gilyto, Mirri Lobo, Val and Robert Xalino
3rd - 2013:
Participants: Nelson Freitas, Carmen Souza, Splash
4th - 2014:
Participants: Gilyto, Neuza, Soraia de Deus
5th - 2015:
Participants: Gardénia Benros, Lejemea, Jorge Serna
6th - 2016, held on May 7:
Participants: Elida Almeida, Gilyto, Hélio Batalha
7th - 2017
8th - 2018
9th - 2019
10th - 2021
11th - 2022, will be held on October 1:
Nominations were announced on August 28, 2022.

References

External links

Official website 

African music awards
Cape Verdean music
Praia
2011 establishments in Cape Verde